Acevaltrate  is an iridoid isolated from Valeriana glechomifolia.

References

External links

Iridoids
Acetate esters
Epoxides
Cyclopentenes